The Jewish Community High School of the Bay (commonly known as JCHS) is a coeducational, college preparatory high school located in the Western Addition Neighborhood of San Francisco, California. Founded in 2001, JCHS is a pluralistic Jewish high school.

History

Founding 

The idea for a pluralistic Jewish high school serving the Bay Area was initially conceptualized by Nancy Zimmerman Pechner, a local artist, in 1997. Zimmerman partnered with Noah's Bagels-founder Noah Alper, who would become JCHS's first board president, to open the school in the fall of 2001.

Tom Lorch was the original head of school, before turning the reins over to Larry Fischer. Fischer, who served as principal of a Connecticut high school of 19 years, resigned after the end of the school's first year. Rabbi Edward Harwitz, the school's principal, was promoted to fill Fischer's position. Rabbi Harwitz, then 37, had been the director of student affairs for Milken Community High School in Los Angeles, California. Harwitz also served as the Head of the Judaic Studies Department and was the School's first rabbi. Harwitz abruptly resigned in February 2005, citing personal reasons. Harwitz was replaced by Rabbi Sheldon Dorph, who served in an interim capacity until Rabbi Howard Ruben was hired in 2007.

Ruben came to JCHS from Anshe Chesed Fairmount Temple in Cleveland, Ohio. The Reform rabbi served in Cleveland for nine years but was originally from the Bay Area. In the past Ruben, who was originally an attorney before being ordained, had worked as the director of the Cincinnati Bureau of Jewish Education and served on the board of various Jewish organizations in San Francisco.

JCHS opened for its inaugural school year in September 2001 in an old pre-school on the campus of Congregation Kol Shofar in Tiburon, California. The school had a three-year lease on the property, and the temporary campus could accommodate 100 students.

Campus 

In the summer of 2001, the New York-based Keren Keshet Foundation spent $20 million to purchase the campus of the California College of Podiatric Medicine, located in the Western Addition Neighborhood of San Francisco. The campus included a multi-wing hospital, a classroom building and a parking garage, all built between the 1920s and 1970s.

Under an agreement with Keren Keshet, the foundation agreed to turn the deed for the property over to the high school if they were able to raise $20 million of their own, or raise enrollment to 400 students.

In the fall of 2002, JCHS moved into the college's 62,000-square-foot, two-story classroom building which was built in 1974. The Jewish Community Library opened its new location on the new JCHS campus in 2003 and JCHS' award-winning lunch program opened in 2004. The first senior class graduated in the spring of 2005.

Academics

In Arts, Humanities, Jewish Studies, Math, Science, and World Language classes, students engage in a broad-based curriculum of required classes and have the opportunity to explore interests more deeply through diverse elective offerings. Many classes are designed with opportunities for students to integrate their knowledge across disciplines in ways that deepen students’ understanding of course content and of themselves. .Classes challenge students to develop their own ideas and questions while seeking to understand those of others, and to learn clear and concise writing, effective public speaking, logic, creative expression, and critical thinking.[11] JCHS offers over 70 classes and includes a strong advanced placement program. Students also have the opportunity to design their own coursework through independent study.[12]

Faculty
JCHS' faculty includes 42 full-time staff members as well as a 5:1 student to teacher ratio. Class sizes are an average of 12 students. JCHS has the highest student to teacher ratio of any independent high school in the San Francisco Bay Area. 75% of the  JCHS faculty holds advanced degrees (21 masters   and 11 PhDs), and includes 4 Rabbis. Many faculty also serve as club advisers or coaches of sports teams.  Members of the faculty serve as AP Readers in Physics, Chemistry and Computer Science..[13

Student body
For the 2017-18 school year, 30% of JCHS students attended public middle schools, 16% attended private schools and 53% came from Jewish day schools. San Francisco residents accounted for 47% of student body, 30% came from the East Bay, 18% from the North Bay and 5% from the North Peninsula.[14]

For 2020-2021 school year, 26% of JCHS students attended public middle schools, 21% attended private schools and 53% came from Jewish day schools.

Arts
JCHS incorporates visual art into all aspects of the student experience through collaboration with performing arts, integration into academic curriculum, gallery showcases and site-specific art installations. Student artists can develop and process film in our dark room, create relief prints on our printing press, or explore three-dimensional sculpture using our pottery wheel and kiln. Each year culminates with an interactive Arts Evening, open to the public, where students can showcase their work.
Through vocal and instrumental ensembles, students advance their skills, while developing their knowledge of a variety of cultures, periods and styles. They may compose, arrange music, and learn the art of improvisation and accompaniment. In addition, they have the opportunity to perform both in the school and the wider community,  including solo work, orchestral concerts, and drama production accompaniment.

JCHS students explore every aspect of the dramatic arts from design and technical theater to acting, directing, and writing. Our playwrights have been finalists in regional and national writing competitions. In 2013, JCHS was the first international school to participate in London’s  National Theatre New Views Young Playwrights Competition. JCHS was chosen as the top High School Theatre program in the Northwest by Stage Directions magazine and we were twice honored—in 2011 and 2017—to be selected out of hundreds of applicants in the U.S. and Canada to perform at the prestigious Edinburgh Fringe Festival. You can read more about our past productions here.

Athletics
JCHS offers the following interscholastic sports: girls and boys soccer, girls and boys volleyball, girls and boys basketball, co-ed baseball, co-ed cross country, and co-ed swimming. Club teams include rock climbing, tennis, and chess. 73% of the student body participates on an athletic team. JCHS varsity teams are part of the Bay Counties League-Central (BCL-Central) and California's North Coast Section (NCS). Other member schools in BCL-Central are Drew School, Gateway High School, San Francisco Waldorf School, International High School, and The Bay School of San Francisco.

In the 2011 MLB Draft, the San Francisco Giants drafted JCHS senior Benjamin Sosnick in the 49th round (1,497th overall).[17]

Student support
Each grade level has an appointed faculty member who serves as the Class Dean. JCHS also offers the services of our School Counselor, Educational Support Director and College Advisor.

Technology
"A BYOD (bring your own device) program was launched in August, 2010 to allow students to use a device that suits their needs.  The school also provided one for those who need them.  The BYOD program was launched in conjunction with the implementation of a student learning management system called Moodle."

The technology program was initially plagued by student complaints, including issues with internet speed and an incident in which the Moodle program crashed.[18][19] In Spring 2012, the school announced they would begin blocking Facebook on the school internet network to halt classroom distractions and increase internet speed

"In spring of 2012, the school announced they would begin filtering Facebook and other social media apps on the school network to curb classroom distractions and optimize internet bandwidth."

Lunch
JCHS' lunch program opened in 2004.[10] The program began under the auspice of food services director Jesse Buckner-Alper, son of Noah Alper the founder of Noah's Bagels.[21 In 2009 the JCHS lunch program was awarded the Golden Carrot award, given by Physicians Committee for Responsible Medicine. The award was established in 2004 to recognize food service professionals working to promote healthier school lunches.[22]

Grade Journeys
At JCHS, the four-year Journey program is designed to guide students through their development as individuals even as it fosters a sense of community as a grade. 
In the 9th grade, students visit the Brandeis Bardin Campus in Los Angeles, spend a week reflecting on their own grade-community. They explore questions such as: what is the unique identity of our grade? What does this community give to me? What can I give back to it?

In their sophomore year, the journey to Zion National Park picks up those ideas and adds the element of “sacred place,” a natural setting with which we can form connections and within which powerful bonds can develop. 
As juniors, the grade journeys to Israel, experiencing the power of a national homeland as a place to explore individual identity.

Finally, in 12th grade, with new perspective on themselves and the world, the grade travels to New Orleans to reflect on their “universe of obligation,” learning how they can best be of service to the world, and learning how to build and rebuild a community in an inclusive and ethical way. Students graduate having examined the world in wider and wider circles, and with deeper and nuanced insight about their own identities.

To share and process their experiences after their journeys, each grade creates a multimedia presentation that includes photography, video, music, writing, and visual art.

9th Grade: Building Authentic Selves in Community (Brandeis Bardin Campus in Southern California)

10th Grade: From the Strip to the Canyons: Discovering Our Authentic Self in Nature (Zion Canyon National Park and Las Vegas)

11th Grade: Toward Connection and Peoplehood (Israel)

12th Grade: Journey Toward Service (New Orleans)

Community outreach
Over their four years, students gain the knowledge and skills to offer effective and meaningful service in our communities, grounded in dignity and understanding. Through guided reflection, skill-building workshops and all-school assemblies, students deepen their awareness of contemporary social justice issues as well as the dynamics of bias and oppression. They graduate as global citizens, committed to using their time and talent to make our society more just and equitable. Student activities include interviewing Holocaust Survivors for JFCS's Next Chapter project; serving meals at Glide Memorial Church; helping seniors at adult day care programs; and working with The Village Project tutoring local kids from Western Addition in reading, writing, social studies.

Campus and facilities
·  Located in the Western Addition neighborhood, in the geographical center of San Francisco
·  19 classrooms including 3 science laboratories and 3 language labs
·  Outdoor stone courtyard with a basketball court and landscaped with among other plants, palm trees.
·  200-seat Performing Arts Theater 
·  Combined Bureau of Jewish Education (BJE) and JCHS Library with over 25,000 volumes
·  Kosher kitchen
·  Secure parking garage within gated campus

Accreditation
JCHS is accredited by the California Association of Independent Schools and the Western Association of Schools and Colleges.

Professional affiliations
JCHS staff and faculty are members of the following professional organizations: National Association of Independent Schools (NAIS), California Association of Independent Schools (CAIS), Partnership for Excellence in Jewish Education (PEJE), the Alliance for Jewish Education, the College Board, Secondary School Admission Test Board (SSAT), Bay Area Admissions Directors (BAAD), the National Association for College Admission Counseling (NACAC), the Western Association for College Admission Counseling (WACAC), the American Association of Collegiate Registrars and Admissions Officers (AACRAO), RAVSAK - the Jewish Community Day School Network and the Bay Area Independent Schools College Counselors (BAISCC) Consortium.

References

High schools in San Francisco
Educational institutions established in 2001
Jewish day schools in California
Jews and Judaism in San Francisco
Private high schools in California
2001 establishments in California